Graham Wise (born 13 October 1942) is a former Australian rules footballer who played with Melbourne in the Victorian Football League (VFL) during the 1960s.

Wise was a ruckman and joined Melbourne for the 1963 season. He played in their 1964 premiership side and finished his career with 40 senior games.

During the 1970s he played with and coached Golden Point in the Ballarat Football League.

References

External links
 

1942 births
Australian rules footballers from Victoria (Australia)
Melbourne Football Club players
Launceston Football Club players
North Ballarat Football Club players
Golden Point Football Club players
Golden Point Football Club coaches
Living people
Melbourne Football Club Premiership players
One-time VFL/AFL Premiership players